The Muséum de Toulouse (MHNT) is a museum of natural history in Toulouse, France. Its Index Herbariorum code is TLM.

History 
The museum was founded in 1796 by the naturalist Philippe-Isidore Picot de Lapeyrouse, with his collections being able to be housed (after the revolution) in the former Carmelite  monastery in Toulouse. 
In 1808, the emperor Napoleon formally gifted  all the Carmelite buildings and land to the city of Toulouse, and in 1865
the museum was opened to the public in its present location and under the directorship of Édouard Filhol. Toulouse museum was the first museum in the world to open a gallery of prehistory  thanks to the collection of the malacologist Alfred de Candie de Saint-Simon (1731-1851) and the collaboration of Émile Cartailhac, Jean-Baptiste Noulet, and Eugène Trutat.

In 1887 (on the occasion of a world exposition in Toulouse) the botanical gardens of the University of Toulouse became part of the museum.
In 2008, the museum reopened in its present form (as of May 2018) with the renovations and extensions of the museum,  designed by the architectural firm of Jean-Paul Viguier, having been completed.

Permanent exhibitions
The permanent exhibition has five linked themes:

Sequence 1: Feeling the Earth's power.
Nature of the Solar System and its formation. Nature of the Earth – plate tectonics, seismic and volcanic activity and erosion, petrology and mineralogy.
Sequence 2: Doing away with our notions of hierarchy.
The nature of life – biodiversity, classification, and organization.
Sequence 3: Getting to grips with the huge scale.
Earth history from 3.8 billion years ago. Introduces time, palaeontology and the evolution of life
Sequence 4: Admitting the obvious.
The main functions of living beings—feeding, respiration, locomotion, reproduction, protection and communication.
Sequence 5: Inventing the future.
The impact of human activity—demographic  pressure on ecosystems and natural resources

Collections 
This section presents examples to illustrate the content of each different collection of the Museum de Toulouse.

Prehistory 
The prehistoric collection includes mostly artefacts excavated in France. They also contain comparative material from other parts of Europe and other continents. Notable collectors include Édouard Harlé (1850–1922), Antoine Meillet (1866–1936), Alexis Damour (1808–1902), Félix Regnault (1847–1908), Louis Péringuey (1855–1924), Émile Cartailhac (1845–1921), Daniel Bugnicourt, Edward John Dunn (1844–1937), Henri Breuil (1877–1961), and Louis Lartet (1840–1899), as well as the curators Jean-Baptiste Noulet (1802–1890), Eugène Trutat (1840–1910), and Édouard Filhol (1814–1883).

Botany 
The herbarium contains historic specimens collected by Benjamin Balansa (1825–1891).

Entomology

Coleoptera

Lepidoptera

Orthoptera

Mineralogy

Ornithology 
 The bird collection of MHNT contains more than 30,000 specimens, of which 20,000 are eggs. About 8,500 bird mounts and 1,500 scientific bird skins are included. Other bird items are around 2,000 skeletons and skulls and 5,300 eggs. The collection focuses on Europe (especially France), but the collection  also  has exotic species . Most are documented on card or computer systems.
The bird mount collection of Victor Besaucèle, with 5,000 specimens, is one of the most important historic collections in Europe.
Other collectors represented are R. Bourret, G. Cossaune, M. Gourdon, Hammonville, A. Lacroix, and Reboussin.

The egg collection of Jacques Perrin de Brichambaut (1920–2007) was acquired in 2010. It contains his personal collections, supplemented by those of other ornithologists, notably Georges Guichard, Henri Heim de Balsac, and Rene de Naurois. It includes all the Palearctic species (Europe, North Africa, and Asia), about 1,000 species and nearly 15,000 eggs, and is one of the most complete and best-documented palearctic egg collections in Europe.

Osteology

Paleontology 
The specimens of the collection of paleontology amount to tens of thousands. They date from the Paleoarchean to the Eocene.

Invertebrates 
The invertebrates room was named Saint-Simon in honor to the collection of the malacologist Alfred de Candie de Saint-Simon, presented during the museum opening exhibit in 1865 under the directorship of Édouard Filhol.

Vertebrates

Henri Gaussen Botanical Garden

Henri Gaussen was a Toulouse-based phytogeographer and botanist. The botanic garden which honours his name is attached to the museum and is part of the Earth and Life Science Research and Training Paul Sabatier University. A second botanical area, The Museum Gardens, extends over 3 hectares. It is notable for "potagers du monde" (vegetable gardens of the world) and a "shade house" which recreates the conditions required by shade plants.

References

External links

  
 François Bon, Sébastien Dubois,  Marie-Dominique Labails, 2010. Le Muséum de Toulouse et l'invention de la préhistoire Toulouse Editions Muséum de Toulouse 
 Part of this article is a translation of (or greatly inspired by) the French Wikipedia's article (see the list of title=Mus%C3%A9um_de_Toulouse&action=history authors)

Museums in Toulouse
Natural history museums in France
Museums established in 1796
1796 establishments in France